The Harbour Lights is a 1923 British silent drama film directed by Tom Terriss and starring Tom Moore, Isobel Elsom, and Gerald McCarthy. It was based on a popular Victorian melodramatic play The Harbour Lights by George R. Sims which had previously been made into a film in 1914.

Cast
 Tom Moore as Lieutenant David Kingsley 
 Isobel Elsom as Dora Nelson 
 Gerald McCarthy as Frank Morland 
 Gibson Gowland as Mark Helstone 
 Annette Benson as Lina Nelson 
 A. B. Imeson as Inspector Wood 
 Percy Standing as Nicholson 
 Mary Rorke as Mrs. Helstone 
 Judd Green as Old Tom 
 Gordon Begg as Captain Nelson

References

External links

Lobby card

1923 films
1923 drama films
Films directed by Tom Terriss
Ideal Film Company films
British drama films
British silent feature films
British black-and-white films
1920s English-language films
1920s British films
Silent drama films